FIFA rejected the entry of Guatemala.

Format
There would be two rounds of play:
 First Round: The remaining 9 teams were divided into 3 groups of 3 teams each. The teams played against each other on a home-and-away basis. The group winners would advance to the Final Round.
 Final Round: The 3 teams played against each other on a home-and-away basis. The group winner would qualify.

First round

Group 1

 

 

 

 

 

Mexico advanced to the Final Round.

Group 2

 

 

 

 

 

Jamaica advanced to the Final Round.

Group 3

 

 

 

 

 

Costa Rica advanced to the Final Round.

Final round

 

 

 

 

 

Mexico qualified.

Qualified teams
The following three teams from CONCACAF qualified for the final tournament.

Goalscorers

5 goals

 Isidoro Díaz

4 goals

 Errol Daniels
 Leonel Hernández
 Ernesto Cisneros

3 goals

 Edgar Marín
 William Quirós
 Lascelles Dunkley
 Siegfried Haltman

2 goals

 José Luis González Dávila
 Javier Fragoso
 Aarón Padilla Gutiérrez
 Salvador Reyes Monteón
 Virgilio Sille
 Stanley Humbert Krenten
 Edmund Waterval
 Andy Aleong
 Ed Murphy

1 goal

 Fernando Jiménez
 Tarcisio Rodríguez Viquez
 Juan González Soto
 Nicolás Martínez
 Ángel Piedra
 Antonio dos Santos
 José Ricardo Taylor
 Syd Bartlett
 Oscar Black
 Patrick Blair
 Art Welch
 Asher Welch
 José Luis Aussin
 Ignacio Jáuregui
 Ramiro Navarro
 Kenneth Kluivert
 Alvin Corneal
 Jeff Gellineau
 Bobby Sookram
 Helmut Bicek
 Walt Schmotolocha

References

CONCACAF
FIFA World Cup qualification (CONCACAF)
1966 in CONCACAF football
qualification